Peter Gary Lazetich (born February 4, 1950) is a former professional American football player who played defensive lineman for five seasons for the San Diego Chargers and Philadelphia Eagles. After retiring from NFL football, Lazetich started a court messenger service in Reno, Nevada. His son, Johnno, was a star fullback and linebacker at Reno High School, and played college football at Oregon State and later, Kansas State.

References

1950 births
Sportspeople from Billings, Montana
Players of American football from Montana
American football defensive linemen
American people of Serbian descent
San Diego Chargers players
Philadelphia Eagles players
Stanford Cardinal football players
Living people